() was a Byzantine honorific title. The title formed the basis for a further compound title, .

These titles were part of the reordering of the Byzantine titulature under the Komnenian emperors, where titles formed around the formerly imperial epithet  (the Greek translation of ) were created to denote kinship with the emperor.

References

Sources
 
 

Byzantine court titles